Laurel and Hardy were primarily comedy film actors. However, many of their films featured songs, and some are considered as musicals in their own right. The composer Leroy Shield scored most of Laurel and Hardy sound shorts although they were often misattributed to Marvin Hatley.

Cuckoo theme

The duo's "cuckoo" theme, entitled "Dance of The Cuckoos", was composed by Roach musical director Marvin Hatley as the on-the-hour chime for the Roach studio radio station. Laurel heard the tune on the station, and asked Hatley to use it as the Laurel and Hardy theme song. Generally known as "The Dance of the Cuckoos" it was copyrighted with the name "Coo ! coo ! radio time signal" and was first heard on the opening credits for Blotto (1930) and the Spanish version of Night Owls (1930). In Laurel's eyes, the song's melody represented Hardy's character (pompous and dramatic), while the harmony represented Laurel's own character (somewhat out of key, and only able to register two notes: "cu-coo"). The original theme, recorded by two clarinets in 1930, was re-recorded with a full orchestra in 1935. The cu-coo motif is based on the call of the common cuckoo.

Dance routines 
A number of their songs are accompanied with a dance routine, the most famous of which is their dance to the song "At The Ball, That's All" sung by The Avalon Boys in Way Out West (1937).

Trail of the Lonesome Pine

A compilation of songs from their films, called Trail of the Lonesome Pine, was released in 1975. Oliver was a trained singer and sang many of the tracks solo with Stan singing in duet occasionally. A number of the songs were sung by neither Laurel nor Hardy.

The 2019 biographical film Stan & Ollie includes the actors recreating Laurel and Hardy's routine of singing of The Trail of the Lonesome Pine as done on stage.

References
Notes

Bibliography

External links 
 The official Leroy Shield website

Film soundtracks
Music